Down By The Laituri (often shortened to DBTL) is a rock festival organised annually in the city of Turku, Finland since 1988. In the month of July, the festival is organised next to the river Aura in Turku's city center. In Finland, DBTL is the largest and oldest festival to be organised in a city center. In 2005, the festival took place from 27 to 31 July, attracting approximately 70,000 people and included performances from Panasonic (now Pan Sonic) and Jimi Tenor.

References

External links 
 Down By The Laituri - Official site.

Rock festivals in Finland
Culture in Turku
Recurring events established in 1988
Tourist attractions in Turku
Summer events in Finland